Mago chickeringi is a jumping spider species found in French Guiana.

References

External links 

Salticidae
Spiders described in 1954
Spiders of South America
Fauna of French Guiana